The 2000 Big 12 Football Championship Game was a college football game played on Saturday, December 2, 2000, at Arrowhead Stadium in Kansas City, Missouri. The game determined the 2000 champion of the Big 12 Conference. The game, the 5th Big 12 Championship, featured the Kansas State Wildcats, champions of the North division, and the Oklahoma Sooners, champions of the South division.

Teams
The 2000 Championship game was contested by Kansas State and Oklahoma. Oklahoma defeated Kansas State 41–31 in their regular season match-up in Manhattan.

Kansas State

Oklahoma
Oklahoma booked their place in the Championship Game by winning the South Division with a record of 11–0 (8–0 Big 12). This was Oklahomas's first appearance in a Big 12 Championship Game.

Game summary
In a scene filled with national championship tension and with two teams very familiar with one another, No. 1 Oklahoma edged No. 7/8 Kansas State, 27-24, for the Sooners’ first Big 12 football title.

As OU won a school-record 12th game and advanced to the Bowl Championship Series, the battle royale was about as even as pre-billed for the first 30 minutes.

The Sooners scored first in what would prove to be the decisive field goal in the three-point victory as Tim Duncan connected on a 33-yarder.

K-State then rallied for 10 unanswered points, starting with a 10-yard scoring run by Jonathan Beasley on the first play of the second quarter. After an OU punt, KSU mounted a 12-play, 57-yard drive for a Jamie Rheem field goal from 22 yards.

Oklahoma stormed back to block a Wildcats’ punt as Josh Norman stepped in front of a KSU boot. Three plays later, quarterback Josh Heupel connected with tight end Trent Smith for one of Smith’s record eight championship receptions and the tying touchdown with 2:56 left in the half.

In the second half, OU took a short-lived lead at 17-10 with 5:54 left in the third quarter as Heupel rushed over the goal line from seven yards. Less than two minutes later, Aaron Lockett cruised 58 yards on a punt runback for the first kick return for a touchdown in the Big 12 Championship.

Late in the third quarter and early in the final period, OU made the critical drive of the game. Heupel found Andre Woolfolk with a pass to the back of the end zone, and Duncan’s kick made it 24-17 Sooners with 14:24 left in regulation.

A calculated gamble by Bob Stoops and Sooners’ special teams’ coaches sent Duncan out to try his longest field goal of the season - a 46-yarder - with 1:25 on the clock. Duncan’s successful try was his longest of the year by six yards and gave Oklahoma just enough breathing room.

The elusive Beasley drove the Wildcats 60 yards in six plays in a span of 1:19. Oklahoma scooped up the ensuing onside kick and ran the final six seconds off the clock. For the fifth year in succession, the designated home team was victorious in the Dr Pepper Championship.

Statistics

After the game
The Sooners went on to play in the 2001 Orange Bowl and won their 7th national championship against the Florida State Seminoles, 13-2.

Kansas State went on to beat the Tennessee Volunteers in the 2001 Cotton Bowl Classic, 35 to 21.

References

External links
Recap of game at Big12Sports.com

Championship Game
Big 12 Championship Game
Kansas State Wildcats football games
Oklahoma Sooners football games
Sports competitions in Kansas City, Missouri
Big 12 Championship Game, 2000
Big 12 Championship Game
Big 12 Championship